A leadership spill in the Australian Labor Party, the party of opposition in the Parliament of Australia, was held on 27 January 1976, the date of the first Caucus meeting following the 1975 election.

Dismissed Prime Minister Gough Whitlam was comfortably re-elected leader of the ALP ahead of senior MPs Lionel Bowen and Frank Crean on the first ballot. A much more extensive series of ballots was required to fill the deputy leadership with eight contenders narrowed down to a final ballot seeing Tom Uren narrowly defeat Paul Keating 33 votes to 30.

To date, this is the last Australian Labor Party leadership spill at the federal level to be contested by more than two candidates.

Candidates
 Lionel Bowen, former Minister for Manufacturing Industry, Member for Kingsford Smith
 Frank Crean, incumbent Deputy Leader, former Minister for Overseas Trade, Member for Melbourne Ports
 Gough Whitlam, incumbent Leader, Member for Werriwa

Withdrawn candidates
 Gordon Bryant, former Minister for the Capital Territory, Member for Wills

Potential candidates who declined to run
 Bill Hayden, former Treasurer, Member for Oxley

Results

Leader
The following table gives the ballot results:

Deputy leader
The following table gives the ballot results:

See also
1975 Australian federal election
1975 Australian constitutional crisis

References

Australian Labor Party leadership spills
Gough Whitlam
January 1976 events in Australia
1976 elections in Australia
Australian Labor Party leadership spill